Sangita Reddy is an Indian businessperson who works as a Joint Managing Director of Apollo Hospitals.

Career 
Sangita Reddy is Joint Managing Director of Apollo Hospitals Enterprises and the president of Federation of Indian Chambers of Commerce & Industry (FICCI). She was elected as a Member of the Steering Committee on Health for the Twelfth Five Year Plan (2012-2017) by the Planning Commission, Government of India. She successfully spearheaded many of the sectoral and industrial initiatives of the FICCI's State Council from 2010 to 2016. She was formerly the chairperson for the FICCI Health Care Committee, New Delhi, and a member of the Rockfeller Working Group, where she was responsible for private healthcare development. She is board member of several organizations.

Awards 

 IMA Mediko Award 2019 –Best Female Healthcare leader

Family 
She is the youngest daughter of Prathap C. Reddy. She is married to Konda Vishweshwar Reddy and has three sons including Anindith Reddy.

References 

Living people
Entrepreneurship in India
Year of birth missing (living people)